Port Harvey is a port on the south side of the Cracroft Islands in the Johnstone Strait region of the Central Coast region of British Columbia, Canada, forming a small bay or inlet south of the shallows that link West Cracroft and East Cracroft Islands.

See also
List of Indian reserves in British Columbia

References

Ports and harbours of British Columbia
Central Coast of British Columbia
Kwakwaka'wakw
Bays of British Columbia